The Villalba de la Sierra Formation is a Campanian to Maastrichtian geologic formation in Spain. Fossil dinosaur eggs have been reported from the formation, that comprises gypsiferous, grey, argillaceous mudstones and sandstones, deposited in a floodplain environment characterised by high seasonality and variability in water availability.

Fossil content 
The formation has provided abundant titanosaurian remains, including Lohuecotitan were found in the formation. More than 10,000 fossil remains of various fishes, amphibians, lizards, dinosaurs (Ampelosaurus sp., Rhabdodon sp.), turtles (Foxemys mechinorum, Iberoccitanemys convenarum), and crocodiles (Lohuecosuchus megadontos, Agaresuchus fontisensis, Musturzabalsuchus sp.) are also known from the site, one of the richest for the Late Cretaceous in Europe.

See also 
 List of dinosaur-bearing rock formations
 List of stratigraphic units with few dinosaur genera
 Dinosaur eggs

References

Bibliography 
 
  
  

Geologic formations of Spain
Upper Cretaceous Series of Europe
Cretaceous Spain
Campanian Stage
Maastrichtian Stage
Mudstone formations
Sandstone formations
Fluvial deposits
Ooliferous formations
Fossiliferous stratigraphic units of Europe
Paleontology in Spain